The Lloydminster Bandits are a junior "B" ice hockey team based in Lloydminster, Saskatchewan, Canada. They are members of the North Eastern Alberta Junior B Hockey League (NEAJBHL). They play their home games at Centennial Civic Centre, which lies on 49 Avenue, one block into Saskatchewan.

History 
Since the 1990–91 season, the Lloydminster Bandits have been the league champion 14 times including a 9 consecutive year run (1991–1999).  As the league champion the team moves onto the Russ Barnes Trophy competition to challenge for the ALberta Provincial Jr. B Hockey Championship.

Season-by-season record 

Note: GP = Games played, W = Wins, L = Losses, OTL = Overtime Losses, Pts = Points, GF = Goals for, GA = Goals against, PIM = Penalties in minutes

Russ Barnes Trophy 
Alberta Jr. B Provincial Championships

Keystone Cup 
Western Canadian Jr. B Championships  (Northern Ontario to British Columbia)
Six teams in round robin play – 1st vs 2nd for gold/silver & 3rd vs. 4th for bronze.

NHL alumni 
Lance Ward

Awards and trophies 
Keystone Cup
1992–93
1994–95

Russ Barnes Trophy
1990–91
1992–93
1994–95
1996–97
1997–98
2008–09

NEAJBHL Championship
1990–91
1991–92
1992–93
1993–94
1994–95
1995–96
1996–97
1997–98
1998–99
2001–02
2002–03
2003–04
2008–09
2009–10

Top Defenseman
Kodi Sawka: 2010–11

Most Valuable Player
Ian McAllister: 2010–11

See also 
List of ice hockey teams in Alberta

External links 
Official website of the Lloydminster Bandits

Ice hockey teams in Alberta
Sport in Lloydminster